The Jewish Report is a weekly publication of the Jewish community in South Africa.

External links 
 SA Jewish Report Official Website

Jewish newspapers
Weekly newspapers published in South Africa
Jews and Judaism in South Africa
Mass media in Johannesburg
Publications established in 1998